Cheshmeh Sara Rural District is in the Qarah Quyun District of Showt County, West Azerbaijan province, Iran. At the time of the census of 2006, its constituent villages were in the former Showt District of Maku County. At the following census of 2011, there were 6,343 inhabitants in 1,635 households, by which time the district had been separated from the county, Showt County established, and divided into two districts: the Central District and Qarah Quyun Districts. At the most recent census of 2016, the population of the rural district was 5,431 in 1,600 households. The largest of its 20 villages was Mokhor, with 2,321 people.

References 

Showt County

Rural Districts of West Azerbaijan Province

Populated places in West Azerbaijan Province

Populated places in Showt County

fa:دهستان چشمه‌سرا